Transatlantic is an upcoming seven-part television limited series created by Anna Winger and Daniel Hendler, based on the novel The Flight Portfolio by Julie Orringer about the true story of the Emergency Rescue Committee. The series will close the 2023 Festival Séries Mania in March ahead of its Netflix premiere on 7 April 2023.

Cast

Production
Transatlantic was the first project to be announced in September 2021 under the creative partnership between Netflix and Anna Winger's Berlin-based production company Studio Airlift. The seven-part series is created by Winger and Daniel Hendler, and produced by Winger and Camille McCurry. Stéphanie Chuat, Véronique Reymond, and Mia Meyer led the directing team.

Casting was reportedly under way as of January 2022. The cast were announced in March 2022, with Gillian Jacobs, Grégory Montel, Cory Michael Smith, and Corey Stoll set to star in the series alongside Lucas Englander, Ralph Amoussou, Deleila Piasko, and Amit Rahav. Moritz Bleibtreu, Alexander Fehling, Jonas Nay, Lolita Chammah, Luke Thompson, Jodhi May, Rafaela Nicolay, and Henriette Confurius round out the cast.

Principal photography took place on location in Marseille, France, beginning in February 2022.

References

External links
 

Upcoming Netflix original programming
2023 German television series debuts
2023 French television series debuts
English-language Netflix original programming
French-language Netflix original programming
German-language Netflix original programming
Television series based on actual events
Television series set in 1940
Television shows set in Marseille
Works about refugees
World War II television drama series